Semion is a male slavic given name. Notable people with the name include:

Semion Abugov (1877–1950), Jewish, Russian and Soviet painter and art educator
Semion Alapin (1856–1923), chess master, openings analyst, and puzzle composer
Semion Belits-Geiman (born 1945), former Soviet freestyle swimmer
Semion Bogatyrev (1890–1960), Russian musicologist and composer
Semion Braude (1911–2003), Ukrainian physicist and radio astronomer
Semion Budionnyi (1883–1973), red cossack, Soviet cavalryman, military commander, politician and close ally of Joseph Stalin
Semion Chelyuskin (1700–1764), Russian polar explorer and naval officer
Semion Domash (born 1950), Belarusian politician
Semion Elistratov (born 1990), Russian short-track speed-skater
Semion Grigoryevich Frug (1860–1916), multi-lingual Russian poet, lyricist and author
Semion Furman (1920–1978), Soviet chess International Grandmaster and trainer
Semion Grossu (born 1934), Moldovan politician and businessman
Semion Ivanov (1907–1993), Soviet general
Semion Mogilevich (born 1946), Israeli, Ukrainian-born organized crime boss, believed to be the "boss of bosses" of most Russian Mafia syndicates in the world
Semion Morozov (1914–1943), commissar of the Taganrog antifascist underground organization (1941–1943)
Semion G. Murafa (1887–1917), Bessarabian politician in the Russian Empire, also known as a publicist and composer
Semion Rotnitsky (1915–2004), Soviet Russian painter, Honoured Art worker of Tatar Republic, member of the Saint Petersburg Union of Artists
Semion Șestopali (1912–2002), Russian-born Romanian and Israeli writer
Semion Shchedrin (1895–1970), Soviet military commander, senior professional officer of the Red Army when the Soviets invaded Poland in 1939
Semion Yushkevich (1868–1927), Russian language writer, and playwright and a member of the Moscow literary group Sreda

See also
Semione
Siemiony